Acanthurus leucocheilus, also known as the palelipped surgeonfish or the white-spine surgeonfish is a species of tropical fish. It is used commercially in aquariums.

References

External links
 

leucocheilus
Fish described in 1927